"" (literally: Christ who makes us blessed) is a German Lutheran Passion hymn in eight stanzas in German by Michael Weiße, written in 1531 as a translation of the Latin hymn "Patris Sapientia" to an older melody of the Bohemian Brethren.

The hymn inspired musical settings, both vocal and for organ, notably Bach's St John Passion, where the first and last stanzas comment on biblical scenes in two different settings. The hymn is part of the Protestant hymnal as EG 77. It was translated to "Christ, by whose all-saving Light" and other versions.

History 
Weiße wrote the text as a translation of the Latin hymn "Patris Sapientia", attributed to Aegidius of Collonna, from the Liturgy of the Hours for Good Friday. The text of the Latin hymn follows the seven station hours in Christ's suffering that day, and relates to the canonical hours from Matins to Compline. Weiße added an eighth stanza as a summary. Each of the seven translated stanzas narrates a situation of the Passion, beginning with Jesus being arrested "like a thief" ("als ein Dieb") in the early morning hours; the final stanza is a prayer, "O hilf, Christ, Gottes Sohn" (O help, Christ, God's Son), requesting help to commemorate the Passion fruitfully ("fruchtbarlich"), to remain faithful to Jesus and avoid all wrongdoing, and to give thanks.

Weiße published his text in 1531 in his hymnal  for the Bohemian Brethren, with a melody known from the beginning of the 15th century and used in Czech congregations in Bohemian Hussite hymnals.

In the current German Protestant hymnal  (EG), the hymn is number 77, appearing in all eight stanzas with only slight changes. The hymn was translated to English in several versions, for example "Christ, by whose all-saving Light" by Johann Christian Jacobi.

Text and tune 
In his 1531 publication, Weiße used the same hymn tune for "Christus, wahrer Gottes Sohn" and "Christus, der uns selig macht" (Zahn No. 6283a). Johannes Zahn describes the late 16th-century variant of the tune, Zahn No. 6283b, as a deterioration (""). Johann Sebastian Bach used the Zahn 6283b version of the tune in his compositions. The first stanza of the hymn, as harmonized in Bach's St John Passion, goes as follows:

Music 
In his St John Passion, Bach used two stanzas: the second part opens with the first stanza, "" (Christ, who hath us blessed made), which summarises what Jesus had to endure although innocent ("made captive, ... falsely indicted, and mocked and scorned and bespat"), while the scene of the Crucifixion ends with the final stanza, "" (O help, Christ, O Son of God). Bach's organ chorale prelude BWV 620 from the Orgelbüchlein is based on the same Passiontide hymn. The other chorale prelude BWV 747 with the same title does not show Bach's usual craftmanship: it probably dates from around 1750, so is possibly a transcription of an ensemble work "cobbled together" by a younger composer.

Seven of the eight stanzas are used in the mid-18th century pasticcio Passion oratorio Wer ist der, so von Edom kömmt in movements 2, 24, 27, 30, 38, 40 and 42. Mauricio Kagel quoted the hymn, paraphrased to "Bach, der uns selig macht", in his oratorio Sankt-Bach-Passion about Bach's life, composed for the tricentenary of Bach's birth in 1985.

Notes

References

External links 
 
 
 Christus der uns selig macht matthaeusglyptes.blogspot.com 16 March 2010
 Christus, der uns selig macht BWV 283; BC F 31.1 / Chorale Bach Digital
 Christus, der uns selig macht Liederdatenbank

16th-century hymns in German
Passion hymns
Hymn tunes
Songs about Jesus
Lutheran hymns